Witches' Brew (1995) by Terry Brooks is the fifth novel of the Magic Kingdom of Landover series. The plot has an usurper who claims to be from another world calling for Ben's abdication from the throne. Upon Ben's refusal, he soon begins to send several evil, magic creatures against him. During this time, Nightshade kidnaps Ben and Willow's new child, Mistaya, in a dangerous attempt to subvert her and use her innate magic. Meanwhile, Questor and Abernathy are stuck back in Earth to meet up with an old friend, leaving Ben and Willow alone to deal with the new threat.

External links
 The Official Terry Brooks Website
 Witches' Brew Page of Terry Brooks' Website

1995 fantasy novels
Magic Kingdom of Landover
Del Rey books